The A-100 is a 300 mm, 10-tube multiple rocket launcher developed by Beijing-based China Academy of Launch Vehicle Technology (CALT, also known as 1st Space Academy) for the Chinese PLA ground forces. It is a derivative of Weishi Rockets WS-1 with simple cascade  terminal inertial guidance.

Overview
China reportedly received a small number of the Russian Smerch 9K58 300 mm, 12-tube multiple launch rocket system and its ammunition in 1997. The Smerch 9K58 system is capable of firing a ‘smart’ submunition that has a dual-colour infrared sensors for terminal guidance, which enables the rocket to achieve accuracies previously difficult to achieve with unguided rockets of that range. The submunition is fitted with kinetic energy fragment warheads which are said to be able to penetrate 70mm of armour at an angle of 30° to the normal.

China National Precision Machinery Import and Export Corporation (CPMIEC), a trading company that markets Chinese missile and defence technologies to foreign customers, revealed the A-100 multiple launch rocket system in 2000. The system was developed by CALT, which is famous for its ChangZheng (Long March) family of space launch vehicles and DongFeng family of ballistic missiles. The A-100 system is CALT's first attempt to break into the tactical weapons market. The development of the A-100 possibly began in the late 1990s and the MRL system was observed in service with the PLA 1st Artillery Division in Guangzhou MR in 2002, possibly for trial and evaluations.

Although the system resembles the Russian Smerch 9K58 300 mm rocket system, it is not a copy of the Smerch as previously speculated. The A-100 rocket is fitted with a simple guidance system for greater accuracy.

In 2019, Pakistan's inter service public relations released an official statement regarding the indigenously developed A-100 and its induction as part of its Multiple Launch Rocket System of the artillery corps.

Rocket specifications
 Rocket calibre: 300mm
 Rocket length: 7,300mm
 Rocket weight: 840 kg
 Warhead: 235 kg, ~500 submunitions
 Firing range: 40~100 km

The A-100 fires 300 mm solid propellant rockets, with a firing range of 40~100 km. The A-100 rocket is 7.3m in length, weighs 840 kg, carries a 235 kg warhead, and is stabilised by spin, thrust, and stabilising fins. It is fitted with a warhead containing 500 HE-FRAG (High Explosive Fragmentation) anti-armour/personnel submunitions. The submunition can penetrate 50mm of armour, and has a blast radius of 7m. The submunitions have a spreading radius of 100 +/- 40 metres.

The rocket consists of the warhead and fuse, a thrust stabilising system, a rocket motor and the tail section. The rocket motor is a single chamber, solid rocket motor with an advanced hydroxy-terminated polybutadiene (HTPB) composition rocket propellant. The stabilising fins are folded inside the launch tube and open once the rocket leaves the tube.

The rocket is equipped with an onboard computer to help correct the horizontal and vertical deviations. During the first three seconds of the rocket's flight, the onboard computer detects the horizontal difference between the programmed trajectory and actual status of the rocket, and controls the rocket's stabilising thrust system to correct the rocket's flying direction. The onboard computer corrects the vertical deviation by adjusting the warhead detonation time so that the submunitions are spread with high accuracy.

Launch vehicle
 Launch vehicle road speed: 60 km/h
 Launch vehicle travelling range: 650 km
 Reloading time: 20 minutes

The launch vehicle is based on a Taian TAS4500 8X8 wheeled truck chassis developed by Tai'an Special Vehicle Manufactory. The vehicle weights 21t and has a maximum load of 22t. The vehicle has a maximum road speed of 60 km/h and a maximum range of 650 km. The vehicles has a gradient of 57% and a fording depth of 1.1m. The vehicle is equipped with four hydraulically operated stabilisers which are lowered in preparation for the rocket launch. 10 launcher tubes mounted on the chassis are arranged as two blocks of four (top) and six (bottom) tubes.

Variants

A100E
Export version

A200
Development of A100 with simple cascade inertial terminal guidance updated by GPS.  The arrangement of A200 is different from A100 in that each launching box consists of three rows of launching tubes, three on the top and bottom respectively, and two in the middle.  A200 rockets also have additional forward control surfaces that were not present on A100 rockets.

A300
Development of A200 with a range of 290 km and integrated GNSS/INS guidance.

Operators

Current operators
 - Belarusian Army - Local production of A200 known as Polonez
 - Pakistani Army - 800+ systems in service. Locally produced by SUPARCO
 - Tanzania People's Defence Force - Unknown number of A-100 MRLs in service.

Failed trials
 - People's Liberation Army - The A-100 MRL was trialed by the PLA in 2002; however the PHL03 was selected.

See also
 T-122 Sakarya
 Fajr-5
 TOROS
 Falaq-2

References

Jane's Land Based Air Defence 2005-2006

Wheeled self-propelled rocket launchers
Salvo weapons
Self-propelled artillery of the People's Republic of China
Multiple rocket launchers
Military vehicles introduced in the 2000s